Judson McKinney (born August 4, 1988) is an American soccer player.

High school
McKinney was a 4-year Varsity Letter winner during his high school years at Cuyahoga Valley Christian Academy.  In 2004, he helped his team to win the state championship while earning all-district and all-county honors.

College
Judson attended the University of Cincinnati in Ohio where he majored in Engineering.  He began playing for the Bearcats in 2006 when he started all 19 matches as a defender.  He earned his first career assist and was also named the team's Top Newcomer.  During his next season McKinney was moved to central midfield and earned 2 assists while logging over 1,700 minutes of playing time and starting 20 matches.

Professional career
After four seasons at the University of Cincinnati, McKinney joined USL Premier Development League club Dayton Dutch Lions for the 2010 where he made seven appearances.

A couple years later, McKinney signed his first professional contract with USL Pro club Charlotte Eagles and made his debut on April 7, 2012 in a 2-0 loss to Orlando City.

On October 17, 2012 it was announced that McKinney had signed with the now defunct Chicago Soul FC of the MISL.  He earned two caps before suffering a season-ending injury against the Baltimore Blast.  In the 1st quarter of McKinney's 2nd match for Chicago Soul FC he collided with the boards and broke the humerus bone in his left arm.  During his 2 caps he managed 3 shots on goal.

After being sidelined for the 2012-2013 season by the injury and surgery to his left arm McKinney signed on with the Milwaukee Wave.  It was announced on Monday, October 4, 2013 that McKinney had been signed to a 2-year contract with the Wave.

In March 2015, McKinney signed for NASL side Indy Eleven.

References

External links
 University of Cincinnati bio

1988 births
Living people
American soccer players
Cincinnati Bearcats men's soccer players
Cleveland Internationals players
Dayton Dutch Lions players
Akron Summit Assault players
Charlotte Eagles players
Chicago Soul FC players
Indy Eleven players
USL League Two players
USL Championship players
Major Indoor Soccer League (2008–2014) players
People from Cuyahoga Falls, Ohio
Soccer players from Ohio
Association football midfielders
Association football defenders
Milwaukee Wave players
Major Arena Soccer League players